Sanathana Sarathi may refer to:
 Sanātana Sārathi (translated as "eternal charioteer"), a name of the Hindu god Krishna
Sanathana Sarathi, a magazine by the Sathya Sai Organization

See also
 Sanathana, one of the four Kumaras, or sons of Brahma in Hinduism
 Sarathi (disambiguation)